Luigi Mele (born 11 September 1937) is an Italian former racing cyclist. He rode in the 1962 Tour de France as well as in three editions of the Giro d'Italia.

Major results
1962
 1st Stage 6 Tour de Suisse
 2nd Gran Premio Industria e Commercio di Prato
 8th Coppa Placci
1963
 3rd GP Alghero
1964
 5th Coppa Placci

References

External links
 

1937 births
Living people
Italian male cyclists
Sportspeople from the Province of Caserta
Cyclists from Campania
Tour de Suisse stage winners